The women's 400 metres T11 event at the 2020 Summer Paralympics in Tokyo took place between 27 and 28 August 2021.

Records
Prior to the competition, the existing records were as follows:

Results

Heats
Heat 1 took place on 27 August 2021, at 11:01:

Heat 2 took place on 27 August 2021, at 11:09:

Heat 3 took place on 27 August 2021, at 11:17:

Heat 4 took place on 27 August 2021, at 11:25:

Semi-finals
Semi-final 1 took place on 27 August 2021, at 19:40:

Semi-final 2 took place on 27 August 2021, at 19:48:

Final
The final took place on 28 August 2021, at 11:45:

References

Women's 400 metres T11
2021 in women's athletics